Thiadiaye Arrondissement  is an arrondissement of the M'bour Department in the Thiès Region of Senegal.

Subdivisions
The Thiadiaye arrondissement is divided administratively into rural communities. These in turn are subdivided into villages.

Arrondissements of Senegal
Thiès Region